Taisot is a small valley, with Bilchar village as its principle locality, located in the vicinity of six thousander Bilchar Peak in Gilgit District, in north-east of Gilgit city.

Alternate names
The name of the valley is also written as Tesot or Teysot.

See also
Gilgit
Jalalabad
Danyor
Bagrot Valley

Notes

Valleys of Gilgit-Baltistan